The jade tree frog (Zhangixalus dulitensis) is a species of frog in the family Rhacophoridae found in northern Borneo. Its natural habitats are subtropical or tropical moist lowland forests and intermittent freshwater marshes. It is becoming rare due to habitat loss.

References

Dulitensis
Taxonomy articles created by Polbot
Amphibians described in 1892